Ian White may refer to:

 Ian H. White (born 1959), Northern Irish professor of engineering
 Ian White (darts player) (born 1970), English darts player
 Ian White (footballer) (born 1935), Scottish footballer who played for Leicester City and Southampton in the 1950s and 1960s
 Ian White (ice hockey) (born 1984), Canadian ice hockey player
 Ian White, President of the Methodist Conference for 2002
 Ian White (politician) (born 1945), British Member of the European Parliament
 Ian Herbert White (born 1949), Australian business executive

See also
 Ian White-Thomson (1904–1997), Anglican clergyman
 Ian Whyte (disambiguation)